The Soldier Lakes are a cluster of more than a dozen glacial tarns in the Ruby Mountains, in Elko County in the northeastern part of the state of Nevada. They have a combined area of approximately 6 acres (2.4 hectares), and a depth of up to 14 feet (4 m).

The Soldier Lakes are some of the sources of Soldier Creek, which flows from the eastern side of the Ruby Mountains through Soldier Canyon, exits the mountains to the west into Lamoille Valley, and then merges with the main branch of the Humboldt River.

Lakes of Elko County, Nevada
Ruby Mountains
Lakes of Nevada
Lakes of the Great Basin